The 5 Lexington Avenue Express is a rapid transit service in the A Division of the New York City Subway. Its route emblem, or "bullet", is colored apple green since it uses the IRT Lexington Avenue Line in Manhattan.

The 5 operates at all times. Weekday service operates between Dyre Avenue in Eastchester, Bronx, and Flatbush Avenue–Brooklyn College in Flatbush, Brooklyn, making local stops in the Bronx and express stops in Manhattan and Brooklyn. During rush hours in the peak direction, 5 trains operate express in the Bronx between East 180th Street and Third Avenue–149th Street. Limited rush hour service originates and/or terminates at Nereid Avenue or Gun Hill Road/White Plains Road in the Bronx instead of Dyre Avenue, as well as either at Utica or New Lots Avenues in Brooklyn instead of Flatbush Avenue. The 5 short turns at Bowling Green in the Financial District of Manhattan on weekends and operates as a shuttle between Dyre Avenue and East 180th Street during late nights.

Historically, the 5 has run south to Crown Heights–Utica Avenue or New Lots Avenue. Its northern terminal was originally Wakefield–241st Street or East 180th Street. The section between Dyre Avenue and East 180th Street, which was acquired from the defunct New York, Westchester and Boston Railway and started operating as a shuttle in 1941, was connected to the rest of the subway in 1957 and became part of the 5 in 1965. Since 1983, most trains run only to Bowling Green or Flatbush Avenue, although some rush-hour trains still run to/from Utica or New Lots Avenues. Peak service on White Plains Road was cut from 241st Street to 238th Street. During many weekends from 2017 to 2019, service ran between 241st Street and Flatbush Avenue, replacing 2 service.

Service history

Early history 
The section from East 180th Street to Dyre Avenue was once part of the mainline of the New York, Westchester and Boston Railway, a standard gauge electric commuter railroad built by the New York, New Haven and Hartford Railroad. Upon its closure in 1937, the entire property was put up for sale.

On December 21, 1925, the number of Manhattan-bound through trains in the morning rush hour,  from the White Plains Road Line was doubled with the addition of two more through trips, and service was considerably increase in the evening rush hour toward the Bronx, with through trains running every 11 minutes. In 1926, during the morning rush hour, several northbound trains terminated at 86th Street.

Beginning on April 28, 1930, Saturday 5 service to Crown Heights–Utica Avenue began.

As of 1934, trains normally ran from Wakefield–241st Street or East 180th Street to Atlantic Avenue–Barclays Center. During weekday rush hours and weekend afternoons they were extended to Utica Avenue. Late-night service was not operated.

From July 24, 1938, to September 18, 1938, there was Sunday daytime 5 service to New Lots Avenue. Beginning on July 10, 1939, Sunday afternoon 5 service to New Lots began.

1940s through 1960s

Main service 
On December 22, 1946, alternate Sunday morning 5 service to New Lots began. However, on March 5, 1950, 5 service was cut back to Utica Avenue all day on Sundays.

Express service on the IRT White Plains Road Line began on April 23, 1953 with alternate 5 trains using the middle track between East 180th Street and 149th Street during the weekday rush in the peak direction. Starting on October 2, 1953, the express 5 trains began running express between East 180th Street and Gun Hill Road - also using the middle track - and were branded as "Thru-Express" trains in order to encourage passengers who changed at Gun Hill Road for Third Avenue Elevated service to stay on subway trains. On June 7, 1954, to speed up service, thru-expresses began skipping 138th Street, allowing for one more train per hour. On June 16, 1958, these 5 trains resumed stopping at 138th Street, with 4 trains skipping the station during rush hours.

Beginning on May 3, 1957, limited rush hour 5 service ran to Flatbush Avenue–Brooklyn College replacing the 4 service. Evening, Saturday afternoon, and Sunday trains were cut back to South Ferry.

Beginning on March 1, 1960, evening trains began making all stops in Manhattan. Beginning on April 8, 1960, weekday evening service was discontinued, as was weekday rush service to Flatbush Avenue.

Starting on April 18, 1965, most daytime service was rerouted to Eastchester–Dyre Avenue (see ), replacing 2 daytime service to Dyre Avenue except evenings and late nights when shuttle service served Dyre Avenue. Some weekday rush peak-direction service to 241st Street was retained, while Saturday and Sunday evening trains were cut back from 241st Street to East 180th Street. Also, Saturday morning trains were cut back from Atlantic Avenue to South Ferry. Starting on May 3, 1965, trains to or from 241st Street began making all stops between Gun Hill Road and East 180th Street.

Dyre Avenue Shuttle
In 1940, the City of New York purchased the New York, Westchester and Boston Railway, and began integrating the line into the system. Plans were made for restoring the old line north into Westchester County, but ultimately failed, and the superfluous track and overhead catenary on the old NYW&B were scrapped by 1943. The section below East 180th Street to Greens Farm Junction was once used to interchange with the New Haven (and later Penn Central and Conrail) to bring subway cars and other equipment on and off the system. That section was removed in the 1970s, isolating this part of the subway from the interchange.

The East 180th Street–Dyre Avenue Shuttle or Dyre Avenue Shuttle was established as a new subway service and full-time shuttle along this section on May 15, 1941, between the former East 180th Street station of the New York, Westchester and Boston Railway and Eastchester–Dyre Avenue, the northernmost station on the NYW&B within New York City. There was a paper transfer to the IRT White Plains Road Line at East 180th Street, since there were no track connections between the lines. The shuttle was run with trains consisting of two cars, and there was no late night service when the line opened in 1941. The fares were collected in the stations during rush hours, and by conductors on the trains when ridership was light.

In 1957, a flyover connection opened between the East 180th Street station of the White Plains Road Line and the Dyre Avenue Line, enabling through service by trains from the 2 route from Manhattan to Dyre Avenue. At the same time, the former NYW&B station was closed and the off-hours Dyre Avenue Shuttle rerouted to the White Plains Road Line station. Effective April 18, 1965, the Dyre Avenue Line was instead served by 5 trains at all times. The line is still operated as a shuttle late nights, labeled as part of the 5 route.

1970s and 1980s 
Beginning on May 23, 1976, 5 service began starting late on Sunday mornings. As of May 24, 1976, weekday midday 5 service, from 10:30 a.m. to 3:30 p.m. was cut back to Bowling Green from Atlantic Avenue. 

On October 26, 1978, the NYCTA presented a plan to Bronx Community Board 12 to have all rush hour peak-direction thru-expresses from the White Plains Road Line run express between Gun Hill Road and East 180th Street, and to have all trains from Dyre Avenue run express in the Bronx. The changes were expected to be implemented in 12 to 19 months.

In 1979, with the color coding of subway routes based on their trunk line in Manhattan, the 5 service's color was changed to apple green, as it goes via the Lexington Avenue Line in Manhattan. On January 13, 1980, all 5 service to/from Dyre Avenue and Wakefield–241st Street during rush hours in the peak direction began running express in the Bronx. 5 service was re-extended to Atlantic Avenue on May 15, 1980.

On July 10, 1983 rush hour 5 trains were rerouted from Utica Avenue to Flatbush Avenue with limited service to/from Utica Avenue or New Lots Avenue. Beginning on January 18, 1988, all midday 5 service was cut back to Bowling Green, to allow 4 service to operate to Utica.

1990s 
In Spring 1995, rush hour service to 241st Street was cut back to Nereid Avenue. 241st Street had insufficient capacity to terminate all 2 and 5 trains during rush hours, requiring some 2 and 5 trips to terminate at Nereid Avenue. To ease passenger confusion regarding which trips terminate where and to provide more reliable service, it was decided to have all 2 trips terminate at 241st Street and have all 5 trains terminate at 238th Street. In addition, the span of 5 peak period Bronx express service to Dyre Avenue was expanded by 45 minutes in each rush hour. These two recommendations were made in response to comments made as part of the Northeast Bronx Comprehensive Study. New York City Transit decided against operating all 5 trains via the Dyre Avenue Line because it would reduce the attractiveness of the White Plains Road Line as it would force passengers using the Lexington Avenue Line to transfer. However, this would have simplified operations.

On December 9, 1999, New York City Transit released a proposal, revising 2 and 5 service in the Bronx to eliminate a merge north of the East 180th Street station, increasing capacity and reducing delays, to the Metropolitan Transportation Authority (MTA) Board. Dyre Avenue-bound 5 trains would start running local along the White Plains Road Line, while 2 trains would run express. Nereid Avenue-bound 5 trains would continue to run express in the Bronx. As part of the change, the frequency of service at White Plains Road Line local station would decrease from 12 trains per hour to 7 trains per hour. Market research showed that riders at these stations preferred Lexington Avenue Line service. In addition, riders on the line north of East 180th Street would gain express service. This change would have been revenue neutral.

Shortly after the proposal was more widely announced in April 2000, Assemblyman Jeffrey Klein collected 2,000 signatures for a petition opposing the change. The MTA delayed the change's planned implementation by a month after receiving the petition. Opponents of the change also argued that it would have increased subway crowding on the 2 train, especially at the 72nd Street station on the IRT Broadway–Seventh Avenue Line. The change was also opposed by State Senator Eric Schneiderman, Assemblyman Scott Stringer and Public Advocate Mark Green. New York City Transit expected the passenger volume of downtown 2 trains in the morning rush hour to increase from 92% of capacity to 108% at 72nd Street. After Assembly Speaker Sheldon Silver put pressure on the MTA, the change was pushed back for an additional three months in May 2000. On September 24, 2000, a spokesperson for New York City Transit said that MTA Chairman E. Virgil Conway told planners to drop the change until service on the 5 was increased with the arrival of new R142 subway cars by early 2002.

On May 28, 2000, the headway of Dyre Avenue shuttles between 2 a.m. and 4 a.m. was decreased from 40 minutes to 20 minutes.

Recent history 
On May 27, 2005, use of the 5 diamond to indicate peak direction service to Nereid Avenue was discontinued.

On June 29, 2009, 5 trains were extended from Bowling Green to Flatbush Avenue during midday hours, from 10:30 a.m. to 3 p.m., following a successful pilot run in fall 2008.

From March 29 to September 3, 2010, rush hour peak direction 5 express service was suspended due to rehabilitation of East 180th Street and signal replacements along the IRT White Plains Road Line. PM northbound express service was suspended again on March 28, 2011, to allow for the second phase of the signal replacement project. This time, service was restored on August 8.

Due to repairs to Hurricane Sandy-related damage in the Clark Street Tunnel, which carries the IRT Broadway–Seventh Avenue Line into Brooklyn, between June 17, 2017 and June 23, 2018, the 5 was extended to Flatbush Avenue on weekends, running local in Brooklyn. In the Bronx, the 5 ran to 241st Street instead of Dyre Avenue in place of the 2.

On November 17, 2019, New York City Transit cut weekday evening 3, 4 and 5 service in order to accommodate planned subway work. This change, which was approved by the MTA Board on June 27, 2019, reduced the span of 5 service between Dyre Avenue and Bowling Green by one hour, from 11 p.m. to 10 p.m., with Dyre Avenue Shuttle service beginning an hour earlier. These changes in service were expected to save the agency $0.9 million annually. In addition, on this date, two reverse-peak 5 trains to Wakefield–241st Street began terminating at Gun Hill Road, running express north of East 180th Street.

Route

Service pattern 
The following table shows the lines used by the 5, with shaded boxes indicating the route at the specified times:

Stations

For a more detailed station listing, see the articles on the lines listed above.

Notes

References

External links

 MTA NYC Transit – 5 Lexington Avenue Express (normal circle service)
 MTA NYC Transit – 5 Eastern Parkway/Lexington Avenue/Bronx Thru Express (rush hour diamond service)
 
 

New York City Subway services